The Forrest Baronetcy, of Comiston (a suburb of Edinburgh) in the County of Midlothian, was a title in the Baronetage of the United Kingdom. It was created on 7 August 1838 for James Forrest, Lord Provost of Edinburgh. The title became extinct on the death of the fifth Baronet in 1928.

Forrest baronets, of Comiston (1838)

Sir James Forrest, 1st Baronet (1780–1860), advocate (1803) and Lord Provost of Edinburgh (1837–43) (after whom Forrest Road was named)
Sir John Forrest, 2nd Baronet (1817–1883)
Sir William Forrest, 3rd Baronet (1823–1894)
Sir James Forrest, 4th Baronet (1853–1899)
Sir William Charles Forrest, 5th Baronet (1857–1928)

Memorials

A marble bust of Sir James Forrest (1780–1860) by Peter Slater is held in New College, Edinburgh.

Forrest Road in Edinburgh was named during his time as Lord Provost.

References

Extinct baronetcies in the Baronetage of the United Kingdom
1838 establishments in the United Kingdom